Grant McMartin (born 31 December 1970) is a Scottish former professional footballer.

A midfielder, Linlithgow-born McMartin began his career with Dundee in 1989. In five years at Dens Park, he made 53 league appearances and scored two goals.

In 1993, he joined Dundee's Tayside rivals St Johnstone and went on to make 28 appearances for the McDiarmid Park club, scoring three times.

His next move, in 1995, was to Livingston. In four years with Livi he made 110 appearances, finding the net on six occasions.

McMartin joined Stranraer in 1998, with whom he remained for two years before moving to his final club, Berwick Rangers. He retired in 2001.

References

External links

1970 births
Living people
People from Linlithgow
Scottish footballers
Dundee F.C. players
St Johnstone F.C. players
Livingston F.C. players
Stranraer F.C. players
Berwick Rangers F.C. players
Scottish Football League players
Association football midfielders